Justicia galapagana is a species of plant in the family Acanthaceae. It is endemic to Ecuador.

References

Flora of Ecuador
galapagana
Near threatened plants
Taxonomy articles created by Polbot
Plants described in 1902